Procrica mariepskopa is a species of moth of the family Tortricidae. It is found in South Africa.

The wingspan is 13 mm for males and 17 mm for females. The ground colour of the forewings is pale ochreous cream, slightly mixed and strigulated (finely streaked) with brownish and with some brown dots and yellowish-brown markings. The hindwings are pale yellowish cream.

References

Endemic moths of South Africa
Moths described in 2008
Archipini